Pitambar Charairongba (17th century CE - early 18th Century CE) also known as "Eningthou Ningthem Charairongba" was the Meitei king and the ruler of  from 1697 to 1709.

Family
Charairomba ( or ) was born on Saturday May 20, 1673 CE. He was the father of Pamheiba, the King that made Hinduism the official religion of Manipur.

Conquests
In 1717, he ordered Pamheiba to invade Burma. The Burmese King had insulted Charairongba's daughter by asking for another daughter in marriage. Instead of sending his daughter, Charairongba sent his son Pamheiba along with a strong cavalry force. They crushed the Burmese in battle.

See also
List of Manipuri kings
Manipur (princely state)
Puya Meithaba

References

External links
 Traditional Religion Of The Meiteis - Manipur Online
History of Manipur - IIT Guwahati

Charairongba, Pitambar
Sanamahists